Filip Filipos Lars Sachpekidis (born 3 July 1997) is a Swedish professional footballer who plays for Greek Super League club Levadiakos, as a right winger and centre forward.

Career
He is the youngest goalscorer in the Allsvenskan history – on 3 August 2013 he scored a goal in a 1–0 win against Syrianska FC at the age of 16 years and 1 month.

In January 2023 he signed for Greek club Levadiakos.

Personal life
Sachpekidis is of Greek descent and is a PAOK fan.

References

External links
 
 Kalmar FF profile

1997 births
Living people
People from Kalmar
Sportspeople from Kalmar County
Swedish people of Greek descent
Swedish footballers
Kalmar FF players
Levadiakos F.C. players
Allsvenskan players
Association football wingers
Association football forwards
Sweden youth international footballers
Swedish expatriate footballers
Swedish expatriates in Greece
Expatriate footballers in Greece
Lindsdals IF players